Lake Linka is a lake in Pope County, in the U.S. state of Minnesota.

Lake Linka was named for a local minister's wife.

See also
List of lakes in Minnesota

References

Lakes of Minnesota
Lakes of Pope County, Minnesota